TNF (tumor necrosis factor) is a cell signaling protein (cytokine) involved in systemic inflammation.

TNF may also refer to:
Talking News Federation, UK charitable organization (see Talking Newspaper Association of the United Kingdom)
The NetBSD Foundation, US not-for-profit corporation that owns the intellectual property and trademarks associated with the NetBSD operating system
The North Face, US outdoor products manufacturer
Third normal form, in database normalization
Thursday Night Football, NFL weekly sports broadcast
Tumor necrosis factor superfamily, a protein superfamily
Tonfanau railway station, Gwynedd, Wales (National Rail station code)
Toussus-le-Noble Airport